Pride Life is a British lifestyle magazine, for at the LGBTQ+ community. Initially targeted towards gay men when launched in 2008, Pride Life is now oriented for the LGBTQ+ community.

Pride Life is the largest LGBTQ+ magazine and website in the UK. The magazine bills itself as a "lifestyle resource for LGBTQ+ people." It provides regularly updated LGBTQ+ news stories and features on all aspects of LGBTQ+ life including LGBTQ+ travel, careers and diversity issues, and legal and financial advice.

Pride Life has supported global Pride events, including Pride in London, Prague Pride, Jasper Pride (Canada),

See also
List of LGBT periodicals
List of LGBT events

References

External links
Official Website

2001 establishments in the United Kingdom
LGBT-related magazines published in the United Kingdom
Lifestyle magazines published in the United Kingdom
Quarterly magazines published in the United Kingdom
Magazines established in 2008